Shuran (also Romanized as Shūrān) is a village in Tarand Rural District, Jalilabad District, Pishva County, Tehran Province, Iran. At the 2006 census, its population was 643, in 149 families.

References 

Populated places in Pishva County